Fallen Footwear is an American skateboarding footwear and apparel brand founded by professional skateboarder Jamie Thomas in 2003, after leaving Circa. The company which was out of the market for almost two years (2016-2017) has now been acquired for a global re-launch by Town Connection, an investment group with its headquarters in Buenos Aires, Argentina.

History
In 2003, it was announced that Fallen Footwear would be manufactured and distributed by DC Shoes under licence from Thomas.
The agreement was cancelled in 2005 after DC was acquired by Quiksilver. It was an amicable separation, and DC President Ken Block said that Fallen was "recognized as the top new emerging footwear brand in the skateboard industry." The shoes were sold and distributed through Thomas' Black Box Distribution.

On April 11, 2016, Jamie Thomas announced on Facebook, Instagram and its homepage that Fallen was disbanding operations.

January 1, 2018 was officially dated as the moment of Fallen's worldwide trademark acquirement by Town Connection while planning for a global re-launch sometime along this year.

February 2019, Re-launches with some of their OG skaters which include Chris Cole, Tommy Sandoval, and Billy Marks. 
They have brought some new models as well as some old classics to their new line.

Products
Fallen was known for their shoes, flannel, hoodies, T-shirts, snapbacks, book bags, jeans/shorts, and skateboarding videos.
The more popular shoes are, "The Clipper", "The Patriot", "The Rival", "Trooper" and the "Forte".
At its peak, Fallen had 17 models in over 50 colours.

Since Spring 2016, Fallen no longer created products. In a note on Fallen's website, Jamie Thomas states that "The Fallen mission has always been to work with skateshops and support skateboarding with everything that we do. Unfortunately, this has become increasingly more difficult for skate shoe brands. Rather than waiver from this mission, we are choosing to bow out."

It is sometime along this year (2018) that new owners plan to bring to the market the most expected brand classics with some added new styles. Apparel will also be available at selected territories.

Films/videos
In 2008, Fallen released a skate video titled "Ride the Sky". The video features Billy Marks, Brian Hansen, Chris Cole, Gilbert Crockett, James Hardy, Jamie Thomas, Josh Harmony, Matt Bennett, Tommy Sandoval, and Tony Cervantes.

Fallen began a documentary, "Roads Less Traveled".

Team
As of January 2015, the Fallen pro riders were Jamie Thomas, Tommy Sandoval, Brian "Slash" Hansen, Dane Burman, Jon Dickson and Tony Cervantes.

In 2011, long-time rider Chris Cole left Fallen to skate for DC Shoes. Cole returned to the relaunched Fallen team in May 2019 alongside OG riders Billy Marks and Tommy Sandoval. Zach Doelling is also on Fallen.

References

External links

Australia & New Zealand Fallen website

Shoe brands
Skateboarding companies
Skateboarding equipment
Shoe companies of the United States
Sports footwear
Companies based in Carlsbad, California
Skateboard shoe companies